Belovište is a village in the municipality of Jegunovce, North Macedonia. It used to be part of the former municipality of Vratnica.

Demographics
According to the 2002 census, the village had a total of 311 inhabitants. Ethnic groups in the village include:

Macedonians 303
Serbs 7
Albanians 1

References

Villages in Jegunovce Municipality